Apheloceros is a monotypic moth genus in the family Geometridae. Its single species, Apheloceros dasciodes, is found in Australia. Both the species and genus were first described by Alfred Jefferis Turner in 1947.

References

Ennominae
Geometridae genera
Monotypic moth genera